Ramesh Prasad Kurmi is a Nepalese politician and a member of Provincial Assembly of Madhesh Province belonging to the Loktantrik Samajwadi Party, Nepal. Kurmi, a resident of Birgunj, was elected via 2017 Nepalese provincial elections from Parsa 2(B). Earlier, he was with People's Socialist Party, Nepal, left it and joined Loktantrik Samajwadi Party, Nepal.

Personal life
Kurmi was born to father Mukti Prasad Kurmi and mother Fulmati Devi.

Electoral history

2017 Nepalese provincial elections

References

Living people
Year of birth missing (living people)
Madhesi people
21st-century Nepalese politicians
Members of the Provincial Assembly of Madhesh Province
Loktantrik Samajwadi Party, Nepal politicians
People from Birgunj